The Duboce Triangle is a neighborhood of San Francisco, California, located below Buena Vista Park and between the neighborhoods of the Castro/Eureka Valley, the Mission District, and the Lower Haight.

According to the 2010 neighborhoods map of the San Francisco Association of Realtors (SFAR), Duboce Triangle is bordered by Market Street on its southeastern side, by Castro Street to the West and by Duboce Avenue to the North. A 2006 definition by the city mayor's Office of Neighborhood Services puts the neighborhood's northern boundary further north at Waller Street (thereby including Duboce Park), while still excluding the San Francisco Mint building near Market Street.

The Duboce Triangle is served by Muni Metro and buses. Because of its location east of Buena Vista Heights and Twin Peaks, the area sees less fog than many places in San Francisco..

A Victorian apartment building at the Northern side of Duboce Avenue which survived the 1906 earthquake has been described as the country's largest wooden structure to the West of the Mississippi.

References

External links 
 Duboce Triangle Neighborhood Association

Neighborhoods in San Francisco
Western Addition, San Francisco